Millunu is an inactive volcano in Chile.

Radiometric dates of this complex include 8.3, 7.2, 4.8 and 3.4 million years ago.

The volcano is constructed by dacite and pyroxene or hornblende andesite. These form lava flows or pyroclastic flows which were exposed by a large explosive event in the western flank. The slopes are also covered with a large amount of lava flows, including a  broad dacite lava flow on the eastern flank.

References

External links 

 

Volcanoes of Chile
Miocene volcanoes
Volcanoes of Bolivia
Pliocene volcanoes